The 2006 Welwyn Hatfield District Council election took place on 4 May 2006 to elect members of Welwyn Hatfield District Council in Hertfordshire, England. One third of the council was up for election and the Conservative Party stayed in overall control of the council.

After the election, the composition of the council was:
Conservative 32
Labour 12
Liberal Democrat 3
Green 1

Election result
The results saw the Conservatives increase their majority on the council to 16 seats after gaining 2 seats from Labour. The Conservative gains came in Haldens and Howlands wards, but they did lose one seat to the Liberal Democrats. The Liberal Democrats won Handside and came within 6 votes of taking Peartree from Labour after 4 recounts. Overall turnout in the election was 38.11%.

Ward results

References

2006
2006 English local elections
2000s in Hertfordshire